WHK may refer to:

Broadcasting
 WCCD, a radio station (1000 AM) licensed to Parma, Ohio, United States, which briefly identified as WHK in 2001
 WHK (AM), a radio station (1420 AM) licensed to Cleveland, Ohio, United States, which has identified as WHK twice (1922–2001, 2005–present)
 WHKW, a radio station (1220 AM) licensed to Cleveland, Ohio, United States, which identified as WHK from 2001 to 2005

Other
 Scientific-Humanitarian Committee, an LGBT rights organisation
 Whakatane Airport, an airport in Whakatane, New Zealand, currently assigned the IATA code WHK
 Windhoek, the capital city of Namibia.

See also
WHK-FM (disambiguation)
Carvel, Alberta home to the CWHK weather station.